Kristian Sundtoft (11 August 1937 – 2 January 2015) was a Norwegian politician for the Conservative Party.

He was born in Åmli, but moved to Lillesand. He started his political career in Lillesand municipal council in 1964. He became mayor of Lillesand for eight years as well as county mayor of Aust-Agder in 1976. He served as a deputy representative to the Parliament of Norway from Aust-Agder during the terms 1965–1969, 1981–1985 and 1993–1997. In total he served during 30 days of parliamentary session. From 1989 to 1995 he chaired Aust-Agder Conservative Party, but he changed allegiance to the Liberal Party which he also represented in the municipal council.

Sundtoft was also chairman of Kommunal Landspensjonskasse and deputy chair of the Norwegian Association of Local and Regional Authorities.

He was decorated with the King's Medal of Merit in gold in 2005. He was the father of Tine Sundtoft.

References

1937 births
2015 deaths
People from Åmli
People from Lillesand
Deputy members of the Storting
Conservative Party (Norway) politicians
Liberal Party (Norway) politicians
Mayors of places in Aust-Agder
Chairmen of County Councils of Norway
Recipients of the King's Medal of Merit in gold